SAMUS: South African Music Studies is an annual peer-reviewed academic journal and the official journal of the South African Society for Research in Music (SASRIM). The journal is abstracted and indexed in RILM and The Music Index. Online access is provided by Sabinet Online, and African Journals OnLine. The journal is a successor of the South African Journal of Musicology which was published by the former Musicological Society of Southern Africa. SASRIM is a post-apartheid amalgamation of the Musicological Society of Southern Africa and the Ethnomusicology Symposium. The journal covers research in musicology, ethnomusicology, music theory and analysis, popular music, composition, performance, music therapy, and music education. The journal is published once a year.

Abstracting and indexing
The journal is abstracted and indexed in:
RILM Abstracts of Music Literature

References

External links

Annual journals
English-language journals
Music journals
Academic journals published in South Africa
Arts journals